Incomit (Incomit AB) is a Swedish telecommunications software company founded in 2000 by Semir Mahjoub, Thomas Gronberg and Anders Lunquist. The company provided software that integrated telecommunications network technology with Internet-based application software. In 2005, BEA Systems acquired Incomit  incorporating its technology to form the core of BEA's telecommunications middleware products. In 2008, Oracle acquired BEA Systems and Incomit's original software became Oracle's Communications Service Delivery product.

References 

Telecommunications companies of Sweden
BEA Systems
Private equity portfolio companies
Software companies based in California
Companies established in 2000
Oracle acquisitions
Defunct software companies of the United States
2000 establishments in the United States
2000 establishments in California
Software companies established in 2000